Bolshaya Glushitsa is a rural locality (a khutor) in Mikhaylovka Urban Okrug, Volgograd Oblast, Russia. The population was 105 as of 2010. There are 5 streets.

Geography 
Bolshaya Glushitsa is located 37 km northeast of Mikhaylovka. Sennoy is the nearest rural locality.

References 

Rural localities in Mikhaylovka urban okrug